The 62nd parallel south is a circle of latitude that is 62 degrees south of the Earth's equatorial plane. It crosses the Southern Ocean and Antarctica.

At this latitude the sun is visible for 19 hours, 45 minutes during the December solstice and 5 hours, 09 minutes during the June solstice.

Around the world
Starting at the Prime Meridian and heading eastwards, the parallel 62° south passes through:

{| class="wikitable plainrowheaders"
! scope="col" width="125" | Co-ordinates
! scope="col" | Continent or ocean
! scope="col" | Notes
|-
| style="background:#b0e0e6;" | 
! scope="row" style="background:#b0e0e6;" rowspan="4" | Southern Ocean
| style="background:#b0e0e6;" | South of the Atlantic Ocean
|-
| style="background:#b0e0e6;" | 
| style="background:#b0e0e6;" | South of the Indian Ocean
|-
| style="background:#b0e0e6;" | 
| style="background:#b0e0e6;" | South of the Pacific OceanPassing through the Drake Passage between South America and the Antarctic Peninsula
|-
| style="background:#b0e0e6;" | 
| style="background:#b0e0e6;" | South of the Atlantic Ocean
|-
| 
! scope="row" | Antarctica
|-
| style="background:#b0e0e6;" | 
! scope="row" style="background:#b0e0e6;" | Southern Ocean
| style="background:#b0e0e6;" | South of the Atlantic Ocean
|}

See also
61st parallel south
63rd parallel south

References

s62